Upparu River is a river flowing in the Tirupur district of the Indian state of Tamil Nadu.

Uppar Dam 
Uppar Dam is built on Dhasarpatty village of Dharapuram taluk in an extent of 445.3 Acres. It benefits more than 20 villages for agriculture Irrigation and domestic purpose. It is an earthen dam constructed across upper river in cauvery basin of an earthen portion of 7400 fr (2256 m) length with a masonry portion of 118 ft long to accommodate the surplus regulater consisting of 3 spars fitted with lift gats. The gross capacity of reservoir at Full Reservoir Level is 572 Mcft. Re total annual useful storage for 2 ½ filling would be 1330 Mdft. There are two canal sluice provided one on each flank of the drainage course from which the two canals take off. The right flank canal runs for length of 12.47 km and the left flank canal for a length of 17.29 km. The total ayacut localized uner this scheme around 6060 acre (2448.150 hectare). Uppar is the lifeblood of various villages like Sagunipalayam, Madathupalayam, Vengitipalayam, Chinniakaundanpalayam, Rangampalayam, Velangattuputhur.

See also

 List of rivers of Tamil Nadu
 Dharapuram
 Amaravati River

References

Rivers of Tamil Nadu
Erode district
Rivers of India